Roberval Airport  is located  west of Roberval, Quebec, Canada.

See also
 Roberval (Air Saguenay) Water Aerodrome

References

External links

Roberval, Quebec
Certified airports in Saguenay–Lac-Saint-Jean